Carolina Miskovsky is a Swedish  musician.

Early life 
Miskovsky was born on 14 January 1978 in Vännfors, Sweden.  She is the sister of Lisa Miskovsky.

Education 
Miskovsky studied rock engineering at Luleå University of Technology from 2002 to 2004.

Discography

Album
 2005 Silence

Singles
 2005 "Remember Me"
 2005 "Like Wine"

References

External links
Carolina Miskovsky at Music Event
Carolina Miskovsky's Myspace
Carolina Miskovsky on radio

1978 births
Living people
Swedish guitarists
Swedish pop singers
Swedish rock singers
Swedish women singer-songwriters
Swedish singer-songwriters
Swedish people of Czech descent
Swedish people of Finnish descent
People from Umeå
Luleå University of Technology alumni
21st-century Swedish singers
21st-century Swedish women singers
21st-century guitarists
21st-century women guitarists